Alfie Hewett defeated Tokito Oda in the final, 6–3, 6–1 to win the men's singles wheelchair tennis title at the 2023 Australian Open. It was his first Australian Open singles title and his seventh major singles title overall.

Shingo Kunieda was the reigning champion, but he retired from professional wheelchair tennis before the tournament.

Seeds

Draw

Finals

References

External links
 Drawsheet on ausopen.com

Wheelchair Men's Singles
2023 Men's Singles